Mohammad Saleem (1934–2 January 2016) was a Pakistani particle physicist and a professor of physics at the Punjab University. He was the founding director of the Centre for High Energy Physics, and author of mathematical physics book, Group Theory for High Energy Physicists, published in 2016.

Biography

Saleem was born in 1934, and received in his BA with Honors in Mathematics, followed by MA in Mathematics, and MSc in physics from the University of Punjab. He was further educated in the United Kingdom where he received BSc in First class honours in Physics. Upon returning, he entered in doctoral program in his alma mater, and successfully defended his doctoral thesis in physics in 1962.

He was the founding director of the Centre for High Energy Physics (CHEP), and served in the faculty of physics at the University of Florida in the United States. He was the author of text of modern physics, namely quantum mechanics, special relativity, and high-energy physics, written in collaboration with mathematician, Dr. Muhammad Rafique, which have been published internationally.

On 2 January 2016, Saleem died in Lahore, Punjab, Pakistan, and is buried in Punjab University's graveyard.

Textbooks

References

External links

1934 births
2016 deaths
People from Lahore
Punjabi people
University of the Punjab alumni
Alumni of the University of London
Pakistani physicists
Academic staff of the University of the Punjab
University of Florida faculty
Pakistani expatriates in the United States
Pakistani textbook writers